David Doremus (born 1957) is an American television actor. He is known for playing the role of "Hal Everett" in the American sitcom television series Nanny and the Professor.

Life and career 
Doremus was born in Glendale, California, the son of Colleen, a model and Robert Alan Doremus, a contractor. He had a sister, Lisa Linn. At the age of seven, Doremus appeared on commercials, with also saving money to attend at the Herman Ostrow School of Dentistry of USC. He attended at Lockhurst Elementary School. Doremus began his television career in 1970, first starring in the new ABC sitcom television series Nanny and the Professor playing the role of "Hal Everett", in which he co-starred with Juliet Mills, Richard Long, Trent Lehman and Kim Richards. He settled in Woodland Hills, California.

With his role in Nanny and the Professor, Doremus earned fame, in which he had later hired two secretaries for his fan mail. After the series ended in 1972, he guest-starred in the western television series Bonanza, where Doremus played the role of "Gene". He then played the role of "George William 'G.W.' Haines" in the historical drama television series The Waltons, from 1972 to 1977. His last credit was from 1981 film Rivals, where he played the role of "Chuck". After retiring his career, Doremus served as a manager of an electronics installation company in Los Angeles.

References

External links 

Rotten Tomatoes profile

1957 births
Living people
People from Glendale, California
Male actors from California
American male television actors
American male child actors
20th-century American male actors
Businesspeople from Los Angeles